In Greek mythology, Perieres may refer to these two distinct individuals.
Perieres, king of Messenia and son of Aeolus.
 Perieres, Theban charioteer of Menoeceus (father of Creon). He was the one who wounded Clymenus, king of Minyans and father of Erginus. This resulted to the heavy tribute imposed by the Minyans to the Thebans.

Notes

References 

 Apollodorus, The Library with an English Translation by Sir James George Frazer, F.B.A., F.R.S. in 2 Volumes, Cambridge, MA, Harvard University Press; London, William Heinemann Ltd. 1921. ISBN 0-674-99135-4. Online version at the Perseus Digital Library. Greek text available from the same website.
 Hesiod, Catalogue of Women from Homeric Hymns, Epic Cycle, Homerica translated by Evelyn-White, H G. Loeb Classical Library Volume 57. London: William Heinemann, 1914. Online version at theio.com

Theban characters in Greek mythology